The Bissa mine is one of the largest gold mines in the Burkina Faso. The mine is located in the center of the country in Centre-Nord Region. The mine has estimated reserves of 4.9 million oz of gold and is operated by Nordgold.

References 

Gold mines in Burkina Faso